Roger Skinner (June 1, 1773 – August 19, 1825) was an attorney and government official from New York. He was most notable for his service as United States district judge for the Northern District of New York from 1819 to 1825.

A native of  Litchfield, Connecticut, Skinner was educated in Litchfield and trained for a career in the law by studying in the office of a local attorney. In addition to practicing law, Skinner began a career in government and politics when he served as clerk of the Litchfield County Probate Court from 1796 to 1806. He subsequently moved to Albany, New York, where he practiced law and became active in politics as a Democratic-Republican. He was a member of the New York State Assembly from 1808 to 1809.

Skinner later moved to Sandy Hill, where he practiced law and served as a justice of the peace and district attorney. From 1815 to 1819, he served as  United States Attorney for the Northern District of New York. From 1819 to 1821, he was a member of the New York State Senate. From 1819 to 1825, Skinner served as judge of the Northern District of New York.

A lifelong bachelor, as a judge Skinner shared an Albany home with attorney and politician Martin Van Buren, who was a widower. Skinner's health declined in 1825, and Van Buren nursed him during his final illness. He died in Albany on August 19, 1825. Skinner was initially buried at State Street Cemetery in Albany. He was reinterred in Van Buren's family plot at Albany Rural Cemetery in 1857.

Early life
Skinner was born in Litchfield, Connecticut Colony, British America on June 1, 1773. He was educated in Litchfield, studied law, was admitted to the bar, and entered private practice in Connecticut.

Start of career
While practicing in Connecticut, Skinner served as clerk of the Litchfield County Probate Court from 1796 to 1806.

He continued private practice in Albany, New York. Among the students who learned the law from him after his move to New York were Silas Wright and Judge Esek Cowen of Saratoga Springs. He was a member of the New York State Assembly from 1808 to 1811.

As a resident of Sandy Hill, he was appointed a justice of the peace in 1808. He was district attorney for the Fourth Judicial District of New York from 1811 to 1812. Skinner was appointed United States Attorney for the Northern District of New York in 1815 and served until 1819. He was a member of the New York State Senate from 1818 to 1821. In 1821, Skinner served on the state Council of Appointment.

Federal judicial service
Skinner received a recess appointment from President James Monroe on November 24, 1819 to the seat on the United States District Court for the Northern District of New York vacated by the resignation of Judge Matthias B. Tallmadge. He was nominated to the same position by President Monroe on January 3, 1820. He was confirmed by the United States Senate on January 5, 1820, and received his commission the same day. Upon ascending the bench, Skinner sold his law office to Benjamin Franklin Butler, who took over his clients and his pending business. His service terminated on August 19, 1825, due to his death in Albany.

Family
Skinner was the son of Timothy Skinner and Susannah Marsh Skinner. His brother Richard Skinner served as Governor of Vermont. His nephew Mark Skinner was a prominent Chicago, Illinois attorney who served as United States Attorney for the Northern District of Illinois.

Friendship with Martin Van Buren
As a judge, Skinner resided in Albany. He was a lifelong bachelor, and fellow politician Martin Van Buren was a widower, so Skinner and Van Buren shared a house. Van Buren and Skinner were Democratic-Republicans; when Van Buren created the Albany Regency clique to lead New York's Bucktails (the anti-DeWitt Clinton faction that eventually became New York's Democratic Party), Skinner was counted among its members.

In an often-recounted incident of political miscalculation, when Clinton's political career seemed at an ebb in 1824, Skinner engineered his removal from the Erie Canal Commission. Clinton had long been identified among the public as the canal's biggest proponent; voter outrage at his removal led to his return to the governorship in the 1824 election. The maneuver against Clinton had been executed without Van Buren's knowledge; initially, Skinner and the Bucktails believed they had brought about Clinton's political death. Later, Van Buren is said to have remarked to Skinner that in politics it is possible to kill someone "too dead".

Death and burial
Van Buren nursed Skinner during his final illness, and was with him when he died in Albany on August 19, 1825. Skinner was buried at State Street Cemetery in Albany. In 1857, he was reinterred in Martin Van Buren's family plot at Albany Rural Cemetery, Section 62, Lot 34. He died without a will, and Butler was appointed to administer his estate.

References

Sources

Books

Internet

Newspapers

External sources
 
 Roger Skinner at Political Graveyard
 Roger Skinner at Open Jurist
 

1773 births
1825 deaths
Politicians from Litchfield, Connecticut
People from Hudson Falls, New York
Politicians from Albany, New York
Connecticut lawyers
New York (state) Democratic-Republicans
New York (state) lawyers
Members of the New York State Assembly
New York (state) state senators
United States Attorneys for the Northern District of New York
Judges of the United States District Court for the Northern District of New York
United States federal judges appointed by James Monroe
19th-century American judges
Burials at Albany Rural Cemetery
Lawyers from Albany, New York